Calais  is a town in Washington County, Vermont, United States. The population was 1,661 at the 2020 census. Calais is homophonous with callous. Calais contains the unincorporated communities of Adamant, East Calais, North Calais, Kent's Corner, Maple Corner and Pekin.

History

Colonel Jacob Davis named Calais after the French port city of the same name, during a time of general enthusiasm for things French as a result of France's aid during the American Revolution.

The Wheelocks and Parkers were the first families to settle the town, in the latter part of the 18th century. In the early and mid 19th century, the Vermont wool industry spawned sheep pastures in the town. Photographs of the time show a heavily de-forested Calais. Like many small Vermont towns, Calais was devastated by the Civil War. Volunteers from Calais flocked to the Union cause, most serving in the Army's volunteer regiments. In the post-Civil War era, agriculture turned from sheep to dairy, and new families came to fill farms that were sold by the families and widows of Civil War veterans.

Historical landmarks

 Kents Corner
 Old West Church
 Maple Corner
 Robinson Saw Mill
 Adamant Co-op

Village histories

Calais once had a village called Sodom. This name was allegedly given because the village had no church, though it did have a few active quarries. In 1905, the residents petitioned the state legislature to change the name to Adamant, chosen to suggest the hardness of granite.

Pekin is named after Peking (now Beijing), China, the result of a local farmer who had a friend who was a missionary to China. The missionary sent some Chinese wheat back to Vermont, the farmer planted it, and it flourished. It became the style to give directions using the wheat field as a landmark ("up by the Pekin wheat", or "just past the Pekin wheat"). Eventually, the location of the field came to be known simply as Pekin. Another version suggests that the missionary sent back rice, and that the farmer planted the rice in a low-lying plain, which flooded each spring. The river came to be known as Peking Brook, later and presently Pekin Brook.

Geography
According to the United States Census Bureau, the town has a total area of 38.6 square miles (99.9 km2), of which 38.0 square miles (98.5 km2) is land and 0.6 square mile (1.5 km2) (1.45%) is water.

The following bodies of water are within the town: Curtis Pond, Nelson Pond, Bliss Pond, and #10 Pond, also known as Mirror Lake.

Demographics

As of the census of 2000, there were 1,529 people, 616 households, and 418 families residing in the town.  The population density was 40.2 people per square mile (15.5/km2).  There were 773 housing units at an average density of 20.3 per square mile (7.8/km2).  The racial makeup of the town was 96.08% White, 0.33% African American, 0.26% Native American, 0.20% Asian, 0.39% from other races, and 2.75% from two or more races. Hispanic or Latino of any race were 0.39% of the population.

There were 616 households, out of which 34.7% had children under the age of 18 living with them, 57.3% were married couples living together, 6.8% had a female householder with no husband present, and 32.0% were non-families. 24.0% of all households were made up of individuals, and 6.8% had someone living alone who was 65 years of age or older.  The average household size was 2.48 and the average family size was 2.98.

In the town, the population was spread out, with 25.8% under the age of 18, 5.0% from 18 to 24, 26.3% from 25 to 44, 32.8% from 45 to 64, and 10.1% who were 65 years of age or older.  The median age was 41 years. For every 100 females, there were 98.3 males.  For every 100 females age 18 and over, there were 100.4 males.

The median income for a household in the town was $46,083, and the median income for a family was $49,107. Males had a median income of $33,000 versus $27,917 for females. The per capita income for the town was $20,722.  About 4.9% of families and 6.5% of the population were below the poverty line, including 7.9% of those under age 18 and 5.4% of those age 65 or over.

Notable people 

 J. Ward Carver, Vermont Attorney General, 1925–1931
 John M. Gilman, Minnesota and Ohio state legislator, lawyer
 Marcus D. Gilman, Vermont legislator, businessman, and historian
 David Hinton, author and translator of Chinese poetry
 Louise Andrews Kent, author
 John La Touche, musician and writer
 Dora V. Wheelock (1847–1923), temperance activist and writer
 Kenward Elmslie (1929–2022), poet, lyricist, publisher, performer

References

External material

Further reading
 Miller, Peter. Vermont People. Vermont People Project: 1991. .
 Rodgers, Steve. Country Towns of Vermont. McGraw-Hill: 1998. .
 Strickland, Ron. Vermonters: Oral Histories from Down Country to the Northeast Kingdom. University Press of New England: 1986. .
 Swift, Esther Monroe. Vermont Place Names: Footprints of History. The Stephen Greene Press: 1996 .
 Van Susteren, Dirk, A Vermont Century: Photography and Essays from the Green Mountain State. Rutland Herald and Barre-Montpelier Times Argus: 1999. .

External links 

 
 Calais Elementary School
 Calais Resource Guide

 
Towns in Vermont
Towns in Washington County, Vermont